Keith Lewis (4 February 1923 – 12 September 2012) was an Australian cricketer. He played in eight first-class matches for South Australia between 1948 and 1950.

See also
 List of South Australian representative cricketers

References

External links
 

1923 births
2012 deaths
Australian cricketers
South Australia cricketers
Cricketers from Adelaide